Taymanitic was the language and script of the oasis of Taymāʾ in northwestern Arabia, dated to the second half of the 6th century BCE.

Classification 
Taymanitic does not participate in the key innovations of Proto-Arabic, precluding it from being considered a member of the Arabic language family. It shares one key isogloss with Northwest Semitic: the change w > y in word-initial position. Examples include yrḫ for *warḫum 'moon, month' and ydʿ for wadaʿa 'to know'.

It is clear that Taymanitic script expressed a distinct linguistic variety that is not Arabic and not closely related to Hismaic or Safaitic, while it can tentatively be suggested that it was more closely related to Northwest Semitic.

Phonology

Consonants

Vowels

Characteristics 
Taymanitic exhibits two major features which are innovative:
 The change w > y in word-initial position: yrḫ for *warḫum 'moon, month' and ydʿ for wadaʿa 'to know'.
 The mergers *z, *ḏ > *z, *s3, *ṯ > *s3, and *ṣ, *ẓ > *ṣ (loss of interdentals).
Unlike Arabic, Taymanitic does not exhibit the merger of Proto-Semitic [s] and [ts].

References 

Ancient North Arabian